Terje Reinertsen (born 14 September 1987) is a retired Norwegian football goalkeeper.

He hails from Spind. Playing for Mandalskameratene, he represented Norway as a youth international. He joined Notodden FK in 2009, Vindbjart FK in 2010 and last played in IK Start from November 2012 to 2014. He got 9 Eliteserien games.

References

1987 births
Living people
Norwegian footballers
People from Farsund
Mandalskameratene players
Notodden FK players
Vindbjart FK players
IK Start players
Eliteserien players
Norwegian First Division players
Association football goalkeepers
Norway youth international footballers
Sportspeople from Agder